Neudeck may refer to:

the former estate of Paul von Hindenburg, today Ogrodzieniec, Warmian-Masurian Voivodeship, a village in northern Poland
 the former estate of Guido Henckel von Donnersmarck (1830–1916), today Świerklaniec in Upper Silesia
Neudeck in the suburbs of Munich

People
Rupert Neudeck, German humanitarian
Ruth Neudeck, German SS supervisor at death camps and war criminal